Jujar (also Romanized as Jūjār) is a village in Dasht-e Hor Rural District, in the Central District of Salas-e Babajani County, Kermanshah Province, Iran. At the 2006 census, its population was 198, in 41 families.

References 

Populated places in Salas-e Babajani County